Quali  is a private company providing enterprise sandbox software for Cloud and DevOps automation. With its flagship CloudShell platform and blueprint-based approach, Quali gives developers, QA, and IT operations self-service access to on-demand application and infrastructure environments across private, public, and hybrid-cloud deployments.offering a self-service platform for Hybrid Infrastructure orchestration and automation. 

The company has offices in Israel, North America and the United Kingdom.  It has additional sales and support channels in Europe and APAC. The company's clients include network carriers, service providers, network equipment manufacturers, storage manufacturers, data centers and financial services companies. Lior Koriat has served as CEO of Quali since 2008.

History
Quali was founded in 2004 by CEO Alex Ackerman and CTO Moshe Moskovitch as Nibea Quality Management Solutions.  In March 2007 it changed its name to QualiSystems, Ltd. and further re-branded as Quali in 2016

References

External links
 

Companies established in 2004